Chocolate-coated marshmallow treats, also known as chocolate teacakes, are confections consisting of a biscuit base topped with marshmallow-like filling and then coated in a hard shell of chocolate. They were invented in Denmark in the 19th century and later also produced and distributed by Viau in Montreal as early as 1901. Some variants of these confections have previously been known in many countries by names comprising equivalents of the English word "negro".

National varieties

1901, Montreal, Whippets 

Whippets are produced in Montreal, Quebec, Canada. They consist of a biscuit base topped with marshmallow-like filling and then coated in a hard shell of pure chocolate.
Whippets first came to the market in 1927, although they had been produced and distributed by Viau under the name "Empire" as early as 1901. They are not associated with the traditional Empire biscuits popular in Western Canada. Today, Whippets are still produced in Montreal at the east end of the Viau factory, which is now owned by Dare Foods. They are currently available with both dark chocolate and milk chocolate coatings, and with several flavors of artificial fruit jam filling inside the marshmallow-like filling.

The cookies are similar to Mallomars of New York City. They also bear a striking resemblance to Tunnock's Tea Cakes as well as Krembos. However, the Tunnock tea cake does not have the same kind of chocolate nor filling.

The Whippet is a distinct part of Montreal culture because it does not travel well outside its area of production. This is partly because the pure chocolate melts very easily (compared with compound chocolate) and therefore they require refrigerated transport in summer. Furthermore, the combination of the hard chocolate shell and the air-filled inner marshmallow make them self-destruct when placed in the unpressurised or semi-pressurised cargo section of an airplane. However, they are currently widely available at grocery locations throughout Canada and occasionally in the US.

Though usually known by their proper trade name "Whippets", these biscuits are also popularly referred to in the Montreal area as "Nun's Farts" in the Anglophone community. Though they bear absolutely no resemblance to the Quebec pastry confections called pets de sœurs, it has been suggested that the combination of dark chocolate coating and white marshmallow filling is evocative of the black and white habits of certain orders of Quebec nuns. This, in conjunction with their light and airy texture, may have given rise to the cheeky Anglo-Quebecois moniker. It is not used by the francophone community.

An episode of the Canadian science program How It's Made showed the production process behind the cookie. However, many aspects of the production process (the amount of marshmallow filling, the ingredients, etc.) were not revealed.  The show's narrator described these aspects as "classified information". As Canadian law requires an ingredient list on each package, the amount of confidential information involved is limited.

Another Canadian cookie, "Viva Puffs", is produced by Dare Foods in five flavours. Viva is a trade name; these confections have been known in (English) Canada for at least 50 years as "chocolate puffs".

1910, Great Britain, Walnut whips 

See Walnut whip

These differ from the domed biscuit or wafer based styles and contain a higher proportion of thicker rippled chocolate, topped with a half walnut.

1913, United States, Mallomars 
In the United States, Mallomars are produced by Nabisco. A graham cracker circle is overlaid with extruded marshmallow, then coated in a thin shell of dark chocolate. Mallomars were introduced to the public in 1913, the same year as the Moon Pie (a confection that has similar ingredients). The first box of Mallomars was sold in West Hoboken, New Jersey (now Union City, New Jersey).

Mallomars are generally available from early October through to April. They are not distributed during the summer months, supposedly because they melt easily in summer temperatures, though this is as much for marketing reasons as for practical ones. Devoted eaters of the cookie have been known to stock up during winter months and keep them refrigerated over the summer, although Nabisco markets other chocolate-coated cookie brands year-round. Eighty-five percent of all Mallomars are sold in the New York metropolitan area. They are produced entirely within Canada, at a factory in Scarborough, Ontario.

1960s, New Zealand, MallowPuffs 
Since the 1960s, the New Zealand biscuit manufacturers Griffin's have made MallowPuffs, a chocolate biscuit that is described as a "light fluffy marshmallow sitting on top of a shortcake biscuit, covered in luxurious milk chocolate". The marshmallow in MallowPuffs tends to be more dense and rubbery than in some similar products (such as Tunnock's chocolate teacakes). They come in a variety of flavours, including Cookies and Cream, Hokey Pokey, Toffee, Rocky Road, Double Chocolate and original chocolate. The slogan from a national advertising campaign for MallowPuffs, "Have you done enough for a MallowPuff", has entered the New Zealand cultural lexicon.

1980, Hungary, Négercsók 
In Hungary, the product is called négercsók ("Negro kiss") and was first introduced in 1980 by the New World Farming and Food Industry Co-operative Society (Hungarian: Újvilág Mezőgazdasági és Élelmiszeripari Szövetkezet) to great success. The production was based on a Danish example, with Danish machinery. Production gradually declined in the 1990s when local confectionaries and food factories had to face heavy competition from abroad.

Northern and Western Europe

Denmark, Flødebolle 

In Denmark the treat was originally made using cream (hence the Danish name flødeboller (cream buns)), but the filling was later made from egg whites to help industrialize production and improve shelf life. In Denmark the confection is known as a flødebolle (cream bun) and was in some parts, mostly in the Copenhagen area of Denmark, historically known as a negerbolle (negro bun) or negerkys (negro kiss). In the 1960s through 1980s the term negro was phased out by all major producers due to its use as a racial slur. Denmark also markets a variation shaped more like a patty, hence the name bøf (steak). Note that the Swedish word negerboll is used for a similar but different confection (Havregrynskugle aka chokladboll).

Denmark is one of the largest producers of chocolate-coated marshmallow treats, producing approximately 800 million of these every year. The largest Danish producer, Elvirasminde, produces roughly 650 million treats, sending 400 million abroad and leaving the remaining 250 million to be eaten by the Danish population, putting the amount of flødeboller eaten at 45 per Dane per year.

In Denmark chocolate-coated marshmallow treats are traditionally handed out in school by children on their birthday. They are found in any supermarket, and most confectioners will have delicacy versions. It is also a popular addition to ice cream cones, offered at most shops selling ice cream. Usually they are placed on top of the last ball of ice cream with whipped cream and jam (Or "Guf", a topping made of whipped egg whites with sugar and fruit flavoring) Sometimes they are even found in restaurants. Many baking enthusiasts see them as a challenge, and it was a technical challenge in Den store Bagedyst (The Great Bake Off) on Danish TV.

The popularity of the treat is evident from the sheer number of varieties. Variation in coating ranging from white chocolate over dark chocolate to licorice coating, with or without sprinkles. The base is often a plain wafer in commercial products, but delicacy and homemade versions often have shortbread, marzipan biscuits or other bases. Flavored filling is also very common especially when homemade, but licorice, marzipan and other flavors are commercially available. Variation in form is also common, often this is seen in commercial products ranging from wide and flat (bøf) to tall with sharp edges (Christmas tree).

Within the last 10 years, luxury versions have become more popular, and has also made the image of the 'flødebolle' change from a basic candy or Cake, to a luxury product suitable as a dessert or present, similar to a box of high-quality chocolates. The luxury versions have a much thicker layer of chocolate, and the chocolate is of a higher quality, available in many variations and additional toppings (Everything from chunked nuts, to small pieces of very thin gold). The bottom biscuit is replaced with Marzipan. These types were usually homemade and only found in special chocolate stores and restaurants, but is now available in most supermarkets, since mass-produced versions have become successful.

Belgium, Melo-Cakes 
In Belgium, Milka branded it under the name Melo-Cakes. These popular treats are sold in packages of six to thirty pieces.

Germany

Industrial manufacturing started in the 1950s. The sweets are made all year long, with approximately one billion made per year, placing average consumption at about one dozen per person per year. They are available in supermarkets and bakeries, and are traditionally sold at fairs.

The interior is always egg white foam, sweetened with sugar, but there are also varieties using sugar substitutes available on the German market.

The German word  (pl. ) is an outdated word for persons with dark skin, and is considered discriminatory by Duden, the pre-eminent language resource of the German language. It is derived from the Latin , sharing etymological roots with the English word Moor.

1956, Scotland, Tunnock's teacake 

In the United Kingdom this confection is known as a chocolate teacake,
though it is entirely unlike the usual English teacake, a sweet roll with dried fruit which is served toasted and buttered. Teacakes are generally served in the afternoon alongside a traditional British tea. There are several manufacturers of chocolate teacakes in the UK, though the best known is Tunnock's, a Scottish company founded in 1890. It was invented by Sir Boyd Tunnock in 1956. He developed the idea of using Italian meringue. He made a biscuit base, hand piped the mallow onto the base and covered it in milk chocolate. The Tunnock's teacake is commonly regarded in the same food category as the British biscuit, eaten at break times with a cup of tea as shown in advertising for the product. Popular throughout the UK, the Tunnock's Teacake enjoys iconic status in Scotland, evoking memories of childhood, or symbolising "home" for Scots around the world.  

The Scottish National Blood Transfusion Service gives Tunnock's Teacakes to blood donors in Scotland after giving blood. There is an online appreciation society for the Tunnock's Teacake and Dundee University also has an appreciation society for the Tunnocks Teacake.  A giant fully edible replica of a Tunnocks Teacake was made by Michelle Kershaw and Nick Dodds at Pimp That Snack. The opening ceremony of the 2014 Commonwealth Games in Glasgow featured giant dancing Tunnocks Teacakes. Tunnock's teacake is more or less the same as the munchmallow which is now produced in Serbia.

The product itself consists of a small round shortbread base covered with a hemisphere of Italian meringue, a whipped egg white concoction similar to marshmallow. As this soft white fondant is based on egg white rather than gelatine, it is much more delicate than marshmallow. This is then coated in a thin layer of milk or plain chocolate and, in the case of Tunnock's, wrapped in a distinctive red and silver foil for the more popular milk chocolate variety, and a blue and gold wrapping for the plain chocolate type.  Several competing brands to Tunnock's, such as Lees' Foods, also include jam in the centre of the teacake. In 2013 British café chain Costa Coffee introduced the giant marshmallow teacake, which is around 3 times the size of a standard teacake, with a chocolate biscuit base topped with marshmallow and raspberry jam in the centre.

An argument about whether the teacake is a biscuit or a cake led to an action in the European Court of Justice by British company Marks and Spencer. The UK tax authorities eventually accepted the company's argument that the teacakes were cakes (chocolate covered biscuits are taxed, cakes are not) but refused to repay most of the VAT. The European court ruled that in principle the tax should be repaid and in a further hearing before the UK Law Lords in 2009, after 13 years of litigation, Marks and Spencer won full repayment of the tax they had paid from 1973 to 1994, amounting to £3.5 million. This case was fought with Jaffa cakes.

Netherlands, Negerzoenen 
In the Netherlands the name is Negerzoenen ("Negro kisses") though some companies have changed the name to Zoenen ("Kisses"). This led to some controversy, since the Dutch word neger was perceived by some as more neutral compared to the English equivalent negro, though both terms are now widely considered pejorative and racist. Those often package nine per box to create the play on words Negen Zoenen ("Nine Kisses").

Finland, Brunberg's Kisses 
In Finland, the name originated from Germany, and they were named "Negro Kisses" (neekerinsuukot) in 1951. In 2001 the name was changed to "Brunberg's Kisses", after the manufacturer Brunberg from Porvoo, for largely the same reasons as in Denmark, Germany, and elsewhere.

Flanders, Negerinnentetten 
In Flanders, the confection is known as negerinnentetten. The word can either be translated as "negress's tits"  or could originate from the French word for head: "tête", as the French word for this confection used to be tête de nègre, which is French for "negro's head". This is also the probable origin of an alternative name negertetten. Nowadays manufacturers market the confection under a different name, as the aforementioned terms are considered to be offensive.

Eastern, Central and Southeastern Europe

Russian, Zefir 

Zefir (may also be spelled zephyr or zephir) is made from fruit and berry purée with added sugar and whipped egg whites. It is commonly produced and sold in the countries of the former Soviet Union. The recipe is a merger of the traditional Russian pastila with French meringue. The name given after the Greek god of the light west wind Zephyr symbolizes its delicate airy consistency.

The consistency is similar to that of marshmallows, Schokokuss or krembo. The form typically resembles traditional meringue. However, in contrast to commercial meringue, it is never crisp. Both pure and chocolate-coated versions are widespread. In contrast to the other confectioneries of this type, it has no biscuit base.

Slovenia, Indijančki 
In Slovenia these confections are known as indijančki (literally "little Indians").

Slovakia, Čierny Princ 
In Slovakia these are known as Čierny Princ (literally "Black Prince").

Poland, Ciepłe lody 
Warm ice cream

Serbia, Munchmallow 
Produced in Serbia by Jaffa, it has a biscuit base and a soft mallow filling covered by a chocolate flavoured coating, and is very similar to the original Glasgow version.

Southeastern Asia

Philippines, Choco Mallows 

In the Philippines, Fibisco makes a product similar to Mallomars called Choco Mallows that, unlike Mallomars, is available year-round. Likely to allow for a better shelf life in the tropical climate, the "hard chocolate shell" of a Choco Mallow is a soft chocolate covering that does not completely melt at room temperature.

Southern Europe

Portugal, Bombocas 
In Portugal, these confections are known as "Bombocas".  Sold by different brands, usually the supermarket ones.  They are sold in 3 main flavors: meringue (white interior), strawberry (pink) and vanilla (yellow). They are being called "Beijinhos" in the last few years.

Latin America

Bolivia, Beso de Negro 
In Bolivia, Chocolates Condor is the traditional manufacturer of "Beso de Negro" (Negro Kiss). The confection is similar to the German Schokoküsse in its use of a sweetened egg white foam filling rather than a marshmallow-based filling. There have been attempts to introduce variations in flavor, but the "classic" version remains the most popular.

Peru, Beso de Moza 
In Peru, the confections are known as "Beso de Moza" (Girl's Kiss), sold by Nestlé.  Currently there is a contest between strawberry and lucuma flavors to become permanent versions of the product.

Colombia, Beso de Amor 
In Colombia and Ecuador, it's called Beso de Negra (Black Woman's Kiss) or "Chocmelo", a portmanteau of chocolate and masmelo (marshmallow). However, these last ones don't always have a cookie as its base.

In 2020, during the George Floyd protests, Nestlé announced it would rename the confectionary and remove the image on its packaging of a black woman with bare shoulders and a colorful dress.

Brazil, Nhá Benta 
In Brazil the dessert is known as Nhá Benta and is manufactured by the Kopenhagen chocolaterie, but other variants exists in Brazil such as Cacau Show's Montebello (doesn't contain the waffle base) and the one that popularised the international formula for the masses in Brazil, the Dan-Top. The cookies are sold in a variety of flavours, including coconut, lemon, passion fruit, caramel, boysenberry, tonka bean and coffee. It is also known as "teta-de-nega" ("black woman's tit").

Uruguay, Ricardito 
In Uruguay it is known as "Ricardito", meringue covered in chocolate manufactured by Ricard.

Australia 
Arnott's Chocolate Royals are a chocolate coated-marshmallow treat of Australia, which are available in milk and dark chocolate varieties, and are similar in appearance to a Tunnock's teacake. Unlike Tunnock's however, royals have a thin layer of jam between the biscuit and marshmallow, and are smaller in size in compared to a Tunnock's teacake.

Southern Africa

South Africa, Sweetie Pies 
In South Africa, a similar confection is Sweetie Pies, originally made by Cadbury's but now by Beyers.

Middle East

Iran
In Iran this is considered a popular treat for children. The local version is sold under several brands, all commonly called ( Bastani zemestani; literally meaning "winter ice cream").

Levantine countries
In Levantine countries such as Syria, Lebanon, Palestine, and Jordan, it has historically been called ( Ras Al-Abed; slavehead), however it has since been renamed to Sambo. In Lebanon, a local variation went on sale in the 1950s under the name ras el abd (slave's head) by Gandour; however, it has since been changed to Tarboush or Tarboosh (Fez) but continues to be referred to by the former name in public.

Israel , Krembo

Krembo, or Creambo (a contraction meaning literally "Cream-in-it"), is the name of a chocolate-coated marshmallow treat that is popular in Israel, especially in the winter as an alternative to ice-cream. "Krembo whipped snack" consists of a round biscuit base (17% of total weight), topped with fluffy marshmallow creme-like foam (53%), coated in a thin layer of compound chocolate (about 30%) and wrapped in colorful, thin aluminum foil. Over time, different flavorings have been attempted for the foam by the different manufacturers, but the most popular have always predominantly been the vanilla flavoring and, to a lesser extent, the mocha flavoring. According to a study funded by Strauss, Israel's leading Krembo producer, 69% of Israelis prefer to eat Krembos from the top down (starting with the cream), and only 10% start with the biscuit at the bottom; the rest had no preference.

European chocolate-coated marshmallow treats were popular as homemade sweets in Mandate Palestine, when it was known as Kushi (Hebrew כושי, roughly Negro) and Rosh Kushi (Hebrew language: ראש כושי roughly "Negro's head") This name was borrowed from the names then used in Europe. It entered mass production in 1966.  The first manufacturer, the Whitman Company, coined the name Krembo. In Hebrew, the word krembo is a combination of krem (cream) and bo (in it). A mocha flavour was introduced in 1967. In 1979 Whitman was acquired by Strauss which has the major part of the krembo market in Israel. During the 1980s and 1990s smaller manufacturers introduced additional flavours such as banana and strawberry but failed to achieve a significant market share. Today Strauss controls 54% of the krembo market in Israel.

Krembos are a seasonal treat sold only four months a year, from October to February. Nevertheless, 50 million krembos are sold each year—an average of 9 per person. Krembos are exported to the United States and Canada, and sold mostly in kosher shops and import stores.

In 2005, Strauss signed an agreement with Unilever to export ice cream and krembos to the United States and Canada due to a demand for products of this type with strict Kosher certification. Under terms of the agreement, they may be sold only in kosher supermarkets and import shops. The distributor in North America is Dairy Delight, a subsidiary of Norman's Dairy. In 2007, Nestlé introduced an ice cream variation of krembo called Lekbo (Hebrew: לקבו, "lick inside").

The average krembo weighs  and has 115 calories. According to the fine print on packing foil, per 100 g of krembo there are 419 calories, 3.2 g protein, 64 g carbohydrates (of which 54 g are sugars); 16.7% Fats (of which 13.9% are poly-saturated fatty acids, less than 0.5% are trans fatty acids) and 67 mg sodium.

Other variations

Chocolate fish 

In New Zealand, a common chocolate-coated marshmallow treat is the chocolate fish. A fish-shaped delicacy, 12 to 20 centimeters (5 to 8 inches) in length, it is made of pink or white marshmallow covered in a thin layer of milk chocolate. The milk chocolate's texture features scale-like ripples on the fish, created by the fish moving under a blower during production.

In Kiwi culture, the chocolate fish is a common immediate reward or prize for a small job done well (e.g. "Give that kid a chocolate fish") so much so that a phrase suggesting a person be awarded one can be said regardless of availability of the treat (and either as a compliment or sarcastically).

Chocolate marshmallow pies 

Chocolate marshmallow pies differ from regular chocolate-coated marshmallow treats in that there is a cake- or cookie-like layer above as well as below the marshmallow filling – that is, the marshmallow filling is sandwiched between two layers of cake or cookie, the entirety then being enrobed in chocolate. Some local names for chocolate marshmallow pies are:
"Chocolate marshmallow pie" (a generic term) in the United States (e.g., Little Debbie Chocolate Flavored Marshmallow Pies).
"Moon Pie" (a brand name of Chattanooga Bakery) in the United States, particularly the Southern United States.
"Scooter Pie" (a brand name of Burry's) in the United States, particularly in the Northeastern United States.
"Choco pie" (originally a brand name, now a common noun as a generic trademark), originally in South Korea but now also in Russia and other parts of East Asia, South Asia and Southeast Asia.
"Angel pie" (a brand name of Morinaga) in Japan.
"Wagon Wheels" (a brand name used by both Burton's Biscuit and Dare Foods) in the United Kingdom, Canada, Australia and certain other countries.

See also 

 List of chocolate-covered foods
 Chocolate marshmallow log
 S'more
 Whoopie pie
 Modjeska (confection)

Notes

References

External links 
 
 Food Timeline: History notes
 Salon.com: a brief reminiscence of Mallomars
 Video of marshmallow cookie factory

Marshmallows
Chocolate-covered foods
German confectionery
Scottish confectionery
Danish confectionery
German cuisine
Finnish confectionery
Cuisine of Quebec
Israeli confectionery
Articles containing video clips